Neologisms constitute a notable part of the writing style of Stanisław Lem, a Polish science fiction author and essayist.

Lem says that in building his neologisms, particularly of grotesque character, he uses the peculiarities of the Polish language.  This presents difficulties to translators into non-Slavic languages, and critics often accused Lem of abusiveness in his creation of new words. Lem said that neologisms come up to him naturally in the course of writing only when they are necessary and that he is incapable of inventing one outside a context.

In handling his neologisms, Lem singles out two translators. Irmtraud Zimmermann-Göllheim (German), in Lem's opinion, remarkably succeeded in literal translation, while Michael Kandel (English) was inventive in finding semantic equivalents in English  in difficult cases. He also singled out a Russian mathematician Shirokov (Feliks Shirokov) for finding fitting language equivalents in translation of Lem's grotesque-humorous works.

At the end of the novel Observation on the Spot Lem even included a "Polish-Polish dictionary" of the neologisms used in it (actually, an "Earthish-Earthish Glossary"). In a letter to publisher Franz Rottensteiner Lem wrote about his intention to add this glossary and to include into it an explanation why these neologisms are a necessity, not just a fantastic embellishment.

A number of Lem's words of particular note may be found in Wojciech Orliński's book  What are Sepulkas? 

Quite a few neologisms Lem introduced in his essays while envisioning future developments. For example, in his voluminous essay Summa Technologiae he coined the terms "phantomatics" for what is now known as virtual reality, "molectronics" for molecular nanotechnology, "cerebromatics" for cognitive enhancement, "imitology" for the creation of artificial life, "ariadnology" for the technology of  search engines,  and "intellectronics" for the technology of artificial intelligence.

The first works about Lem's language are dated by the early 1960s (Wesolowska 1963, Handke 1964, Moszyńska 1964).

Strategies for translating The Cyberiad'''s short story Jak ocalał świat (How the World was Saved), which relies on both nonsense neologisms and words which begin with the letter N in Polish, were discussed by Douglas Hofstadter in Le Ton beau de Marot.

In 2006 Monika Krajewska published a Polish-Russian dictionary of over 1,500 Lem's neologisms.

References

 Further reading
Anusiewicz J., Funkcja i struktura neologizmów w utworach fantastycznych Stanisława Lema, „Językoznawca” 1971, nr 23-24 
Maria Lesz-Duk, "Neologizmy w twórczości Stanisława Lema", 'PRACE NAUKOWE Akademii im. Jana Długosza w Częstochowie -  Językoznawstwo, 2015, z. XI, pp. 141–151  - the article analyzes word formation means used in of Lem's neologisms in Bajki robotów, Cyberiada, and Kongres futurologiczny 
Marcin Fastyn, Neologizmy w Kongresie futurologicznym Stanisława Lema i ich translacja na język bułgarski", Uniwersytet Łódzki, Wydział Filologiczny,  Katedra Slawistyki Południowej, Nr albumu 111212/S, 2006,  241pp. - a Master's thesis analyzing over 400 neologisms in the Bulgarian translation by Svetlana Petrova, Лем С. Конгрес по футурология, София 1994 
 Nowotna – Szybistowa M., Nazewnictwo „Cyberiady” Stanisława Lema, „Onomastica”, XIV, 1969, s. 186–204, XV, 1970, s. 180-201 
 Domaciuk I., Nazwy własne w prozie Stanisława Lema, Lublin, 2003 
D. Wesołowska, Język fantastyczny w utworach Lema, „Język Polski”, 1963, XLIII, s. 13–27
R. Handke, W sprawie stylistycznej wartości neologizmów Lema, „Język Polski” 1964, z. 5.
D. Moszyńska, O stylizacji języka w beletrystyce astronautycznej, „Język Polski" 1964, z. 2.
Z. Bożek, Dowcip językowy w twórczości Stanisława Lema, Zeszyty Naukowe Uniwersytetu Jagiellońskiego CCCCLVII, Prace Językoznawcze nr 54, 1977.
Lem i tłumacze, E. Skibińska, J. Rzeszotnik (eds.),  2010 
PIOTR BLUMCZYŃSKI, "PILNIKIEM, KLUCZEM, CZY SIEKIERĄ? O TŁUMACZENIU LEMA NA ANGIELSKI "
"Monika Woźniak" "Spaghetti z sepulkami : Stanisław Lem we Włoszech" ["Spaghetti with Sepulkas: Stanislaw Lem in Italy"]
 Ольга Константинова, Praca magisterska "Analiza konotacji neologizmów Stanisława Lema w przekładzie Dzienników gwiazdowych na język rosyjski", 2014, Master's thesis
,  Lem – nowator językowy?, Quart / Lem / Numer specjalny 3–4 (37–38) / 2015 - the paper describes briefly the present state of research into Stanislaw Lem's language, especially into his vocabulary, in particular his linguistic innovations (called neologisms), and outlines the main principles of a study into Lem's language that the author plans (with Łukasz Grabowski)
Monika Krajewska:  Polsko-rosyjski słownik Lemowych neologizmów. Toruń: Towarzystwo Naukowe w Toruniu 2006 (A review in Pzegląd Rusycystyczny, 4, 2020. ) -- (analyzed: Bajki robotów, Cyberiada, Dzienniki gwiazdowe)
Julia Mielczarek, BUDOWA SŁOWOTWÓRCZA I ZNACZENIE NAZW ŚRODKÓW PSYCHOTROPOWYCH W OPOWIADANIU STANISŁAWA LEMA KONGRES FUTUROLOGICZNY, Poradnik Językowy, no. 9, 2003
 Stanisław Barańczak, "ELEKTRYCERZE I CYBERCHANIOŁY", "Nurt" nr 8, 1972
Hanna Salich, "Authorial Neologisms in Translation: Is the Translator a Smuggler?", In: Między Oryginałem a Przekładem, 2020, no. 1(47), pp. 59–78 —on translation of neologisms in Pamiętnik znaleziony w wannie''

Stanisław Lem
20th-century neologisms
Words originating in fiction